The ninth season of Extreme Makeover: Home Edition started on Sunday September 25, 2011 at 8e/7c. Four episodes aired before moving to Fridays starting with the October 21 episode. The series finale aired on January 13, 2012.

This is a list of season 9 episodes of the Extreme Makeover: Home Edition series.

Episodes

See also
 List of Extreme Makeover: Home Edition episodes
 Extreme Makeover: Home Edition Specials

References 

2011 American television seasons
2012 American television seasons